The 2nd Islamic Solidarity Games were going to be an international sporting event scheduled to be held in Iran on 9–25 April 2010. The Games were cancelled following a dispute between the host country and Saudi Arabia.

Suspension and cancellation of Games
It was reported 3 May 2009, that Iran had suspended the games due to a dispute over the use of the term "Persian Gulf".  Saudi Arabia and other Arabic countries disapproved of the use of the term "Persian Gulf" on literature and medals and insisted the fictitious term "Arabian Gulf" or just "Gulf" be used instead.  Iran claimed it was still in talks to try to salvage the games.

On 17 January 2010, the governing body of the ISG reported that the event had been cancelled due to the tension between Arab states and Iran over the name of the body of water.

Venues

Tehran
 Takhti Stadium – Opening ceremony, Closing ceremony, Football
 Azadi Sport Complex – Swimming, Diving, Basketball, Shooting, Volleyball, Weightlifting, Football
 Aftab Enghelab Complex – Athletics
 Shiroudi Sport Complex – Water polo, Table tennis (Men)
 Tehran Taekwondo Home – Table tennis (Women)
 Tehran Handball Hall – Sitting volleyball
 Hejab Hall – Futsal (Disabled)
 Tehran Janbazan Complex – Table tennis (Disabled)

Esfahan
 Nilforoushan Hall – Fencing
 Pirouzi Hall – Handball
 17 Shahrivar Hall – Karate
 Mellat Hall – Taekwondo

Mashhad
 Samen Stadium – Football
 Kowsar Hall – Judo
 Beheshti Hall – Wrestling
 Astan Qods Razavi Hall – Zurkhaneh

Sports

Official sports

Aquatics
Athletics
Basketball
Fencing
Football
Handball
Judo

Karate
Shooting
Table tennis
Taekwondo
Volleyball
Weightlifting
Wrestling

Demonstration sports
Zurkhaneh
Disabled sports
Futsal
Shooting
Sitting volleyball
Table tennis

References

External links
Official website

Islamic Games
Islamic Solidarity Games
Islamic Solidarity Games, 2010
Islamic Solidarity Games
Solidarity Games
Multi-sport events in Iran
Cancelled multi-sport events